Lessolo is a comune (municipality) in the Metropolitan City of Turin in the Italian region Piedmont, located about  north of Turin.

Lessolo borders the following municipalities: Brosso, Borgofranco d'Ivrea, Montalto Dora, Val di Chy, Valchiusa, and Fiorano Canavese.

References

Cities and towns in Piedmont
Canavese